Izabela Żebrowska Kowalińska (born ) is a Polish volleyball player, playing as an opposite. She is part of the Poland women's national volleyball team.

She participated in the 2002 FIVB Volleyball Women's World Championship, and the 2003 FIVB Women's World Cup.
She competed at the 2015 Women's European Volleyball Championship. On club level she plays for Chemik Police.

References

1985 births
Living people
Polish women's volleyball players
People from Świdnik